Battle Axe is the third studio album by American drag queen Sharon Needles. It was released on October 6, 2017 through Producer Entertainment Group.

Promotion
The album was promoted by the singles "Battle Axe" and "Andy Warhol Is Dead". Both received accompanying music videos.

Track listing

Charts

References

Sharon Needles albums
2017 albums
Producer Entertainment Group albums